Vlaicu is a Romanian surname. Notable people with the surname include:

Aurel Vlaicu (1882–1913), Romanian engineer, inventor and aviator
Florin Vlaicu (born 1986), Romanian rugby union player
Sorin Vlaicu (born 1965), Romanian footballer

as a given name, it may refer to:

Vlaicu Bârna (1913-1999), poet

Romanian-language surnames